For the state pageant affiliated with Miss Teen USA, see Miss Oklahoma Teen USA

The Miss Oklahoma's Outstanding Teen competition is the pageant that selects the representative for the U.S. state of Oklahoma in the Miss America's Outstanding Teen pageant.

Bella Brown of Choctaw was crowned Miss Oklahoma's Outstanding Teen on June 11, 2022 at the River Spirit Casino Resort in Tulsa, Oklahoma. She competed for the title of Miss America's Outstanding Teen 2023 at the Hyatt Regency Dallas in Dallas, Texas on August 12, 2022 where she was in the Top 11.

Results summary 
The year in parentheses indicates year of Miss America's Outstanding Teen competition the award/placement was garnered.

Placements 
 Miss America's Outstanding Teen: Lacey Russ (2011), Nicole Jia (2017)
 1st runners-up: Ashten Vincent (2014)
 4th runners-up: Carrigan Bradley (2016)
 Top 8: Julianne Thomison (2013)
 Top 9: Evelyn Smith (2018)
 Top 10: Molly Colvard (2007), Jamie Butemeyer (2008), Alicia Clifton (2009), Claire Grace (2020)
Top 11 (Top 10 along with a peoples choice to make 11) :
Ella Phillips (2022), Bella Brown (2023)
 Top 15: Becca Hester (2006)

Awards

Preliminary awards 
 Preliminary Evening Wear/On-Stage Question: Lacey Russ (2011), Ashten Vincent (2014), Joei Whisenant (2015), Evelyn Smith (2018) (tie)
 Preliminary Talent: Alicia Clifton (2009), Ashten Vincent (2014)

Non-finalist awards 
 Non-finalist Evening Wear/On-Stage Question: Joei Whisenant (2015)

Other awards 
 Miss Congeniality/Spirit of America: Becca Hester (2006)
 Outstanding Instrumental Talent Award: Nicole Jia (2017)
 Teens in Action Award Winners: Ashten Vincent (2014)
 Teens in Action Award Finalists: Claire Grace (2020)

Winners

References

Oklahoma
Oklahoma culture
Annual events in Oklahoma
Women in Oklahoma